Přední Výtoň is a municipality and village in Český Krumlov District in the South Bohemian Region of the Czech Republic. It has about 200 inhabitants. It lies on the shore of the Lipno Reservoir.

References

Villages in Český Krumlov District
Bohemian Forest